Sumtu (Sumtu Chin) is a Kuki-Chin language spoken in Ann, Minbya, and Myebon townships in Rakhine State, Burma. It is partially intelligible with Laitu Chin.

References

Kuki-Chin languages